Assaf Shelleg is an Israeli-American musicologist and pianist, a senior lecturer of musicology at The Hebrew University of Jerusalem. He was previously the Schusterman Visiting Assistant Professor of Musicology and Jewish Studies in the Department of Religious Studies at the University of Virginia (2011–2014), and had taught prior to that as the visiting Efroymson Scholar in the Jewish, Islamic & Near Eastern Languages and Cultures Department at Washington University in St. Louis (2009–2011). Shelleg specializes in art music of the twentieth and twenty-first centuries (historical musicology, musicological historiography, cultural history, post-tonal theories, postcolonialism, neoliberalism, and contemporaneity) while focusing on the cultural networks in which art music was written by or about Jews, in Europe, North America, British Palestine, and Israel.

Shelleg’s award-winning first book, Jewish Contiguities and the Soundtrack of Israeli History, appeared in November 2014 with Oxford University Press. The book studies the emergence of modern Jewish art music in Central and Western Europe in the early twentieth century and its partial dislocation to Palestine/Israel in the 1930s. Unearthing the cultural chain reactions this dislocation catalyzed in Hebrew culture through the 1970, the book maps composers’ gradual disillusionment with romanticist nationalism amid the dissemination of modernist compositional devices and against the backdrop of contiguous developments in modern Hebrew literature. Jewish Contiguities has  won the 2015 Engel Prize for the study of Hebrew Music, and the 2016 Jordan Schnitzer Book Award.

Shelleg’s second book Theological Stains; Art Music and the Zionist Project appeared in November of 2020 with Oxford University Press. This is the first in-depth study on art music in Israel from the mid-twentieth century to the turn of the twenty-first. The book unfolds the theological and territorial infrastructures of Hebrew culture while critically reading the works and archival collections of Mordecai Seter, Paul Ben-Haim, Oedoen Partos, Josef Tal, Ben-Zion Orgad, Marc Lavri, Andre Hajdu, Abel Ehrlich, Tzvi Avni, Betty Olivero, and Ruben Seroussi.  In the process, Theological Stains discloses how importations of modernist compositional devices constituted composers’ perceptions of Jewish musical traditions as much as they facilitated their dialectical returns to diasporic Jewish cultures, returns that among other things invalidated national and territorial tropes.  

Shelleg is also a regular musical contributor to Haaretz newspaper.

References 

Year of birth missing (living people)
Living people
Israeli pianists
Israeli musicologists
Academic staff of the Hebrew University of Jerusalem
University of Virginia faculty
Washington University in St. Louis faculty